Taenaris is a genus of butterflies in the family Nymphalidae, subfamily Amathusiinae, that distributed throughout Australasia with a majority of species being located on the island of New Guinea. They are commonly known as the owl butterflies. 

Taenaris are showy medium to large butterflies with predominantly white wings often featuring extensive patches of black, gray, or tan coloration. They are best known for their rounded hindwings which feature well developed eyespots, most of which are yellow in color with blue-black "pupils". Due to their larval diet consisting of toxic cycasin-rich foodplants, many members of genus are involved within Müllerian mimicry complexes.

Distribution
Members of the genus Taenaris are found throughout Southeast Asia and Australasia. Their range extends from Malaysia and into the Moluccas and New Guinea and as far east as the Solomon Islands and as far south as the Torres Strait and Cape York, Australia. A majority of species are concentrated on the island of New Guinea, and thus east of Weber's line. Only a few species extend beyond New Guinea, including Taenaris horsfeldii (found in Sundaland and west of Weber's line), Taenaris phorcas (Bismark Archipelago and Solomon Archipelago), and Taenaris urania (Moluccas).

Mimicry
Members of the genus Taenaris often serve as models within Müllerian mimicry complexes with a variety of different butterfly species, owing to their exclusive diet of Cycads and high levels of toxic cycasin within their bodies. Mimics of Taenaris species include pale forms of Papilio aegeus (Papilionidae), Elymnias agondas (Nymphalidae), Hypolimnas deois (Nymphalidae), Mycalesis drusillodes (Nymphalidae), and Hyantis hodeva (Nymphalidae).

Species
unknown species group
Taenaris alocus Brooks, 1950
Taenaris artemis (Vollenhoven, 1860)
Taenaris bioculatus (Guérin-Méneville, [1830])
Taenaris butleri (Oberthür, 1880)
Taenaris catops (Westwood, 1851)
Taenaris chionides (Godman & Salvin, 1880)
Taenaris cyclops Staudinger, 1894
Taenaris diana Butler, 1870
Taenaris dimona (Hewitson, 1862)
Taenaris dina Staudinger, 1894
Taenaris dioptrica (Vollenhoven, 1860)
Taenaris domitilla (Hewitson, 1861)
Taenaris gorgo (Kirsch, 1877)
Taenaris honrathi Staudinger, 1887
Taenaris horsfieldii (Swainson, [1820])
Taenaris hyperbolus (Kirsch, 1877)
Taenaris macrops (C. & R. Felder, 1860)
Taenaris mailua Grose-Smith, 1897
Taenaris montana Stichel, 1906
Taenaris myops (C. & R. Felder, 1860)
Taenaris onolaus (Kirsch, 1877)
Taenaris phorcas (Westwood, 1858)
Taenaris scylla Staudinger, 1887
Taenaris selene (Westwood, 1851)
Taenaris urania (Linnaeus, 1758)
morphotenaris species group
Taenaris nivescens (Rothschild, 1896)
Taenaris schoenbergi (Fruhstorfer, 1893)

References

 
Butterfly genera
Taxa named by Jacob Hübner